Eight Bells is the sixth and final studio album by SubArachnoid Space, released on September 22, 2009 by Crucial Blast.

Track listing

Personnel 
Adapted from the Eight Bells liner notes.

SubArachnoid Space
 Daniel Barone – bass guitar
 Melynda Jackson – guitar
 Steven Wray Lobdell – acoustic guitar, percussion, production, engineering, mixing, mastering
 Lauren K Newman – drums
 Daniel Osborne – guitar

Production and additional personnel
 Stephen Kasner – cover art
 SubArachnoid Space – production
 Adam Wright – design

Release history

References

External links 
 Eight Bells at Bandcamp
 

2009 albums
SubArachnoid Space albums